A pot pie, in US and Canadian dialects, is a type of meat pie with a top pie crust that is commonly used throughout the continent, consisting of flaky pastry. Pot pies may be made with a variety of fillings including poultry, beef, seafood, or plant-based meat substitute fillings, and may also differ in the types of crust. In both countries, various versions exist and can vary significantly in terms of both preparation and ingredients, with chicken pot pie being the most popular variety of the dish.

Origin 

In the 16th century, the English gentry revived the custom of serving pies and the tradition soon swept the country.  A British food commenter once described them as, "which they bake in pasties, and this venison pasty is a dainty rarely found in any other kingdom." The meat pies made by the English of that era (called pot pies in North America) would include various meats such as pork, lamb, birds and game. During the reign of Elizabeth I, English cooks made pies using “chicken peepers,” which consisted of chicks stuffed with gooseberries. The obsession with pies spread to the New World soon after it spread across Europe when the first American settlers took their pie recipes with them when they moved westward.

Preparation

Pot pie can be prepared in a many of ways including in a skillet over a stovetop, in a baking dish in an oven, or in a pie iron over a campfire. There are numerous other types of pot pies including taco, ham and brie pizza, and steak and mushroom. The pie shell and crust can be made from scratch or can be fashioned from store bought pie crust or biscuit dough and includes ingredients such as butter, lard, olive oil, flour, and shortening. Once prepared and served, the pot pie leftovers can be stored in the freezer for later consumption.

Pennsylvania Dutch pot pie
In the Pennsylvania Dutch region, some people make a dish called "bot boi" (or "bottboi") by Pennsylvania German-speaking natives. Pennsylvania Dutch pot pie is a stew without a crust. Most commonly made with chicken, it usually includes homemade dumpling-style dough noodles and potatoes, and sometimes vegetables such as carrots or celery.

See also
American cuisine
Meat pie
Pie

References

American pies
Pies
Savoury pies